Chancelade is a commune in the Dordogne department in Nouvelle-Aquitaine in southwestern France. The village is the site of Chancelade Abbey.

The so-called "Chancelade man" was found in the nearby Raymonden rock shelter in 1888, 
the skeleton of an approximately 60-year-old male who was buried there in the Magdalenian, roughly 15,000 years ago.

Population

See also
Communes of the Dordogne department

References

Communes of Dordogne